360 is a privately owned television channel in Turkey.

History 

The first name of the channel is Skytürk. On January 23, 2012, the name of the channel was changed to "Skytürk 360". On December 31, 2013, "Skytürk" was removed from the channel's name. On 1 December 2014, the format of the channel was changed to a national channel, as the new owners of the channel owned another news channel called 24.

Also, the "Skytürk" is not the Turkish version of Sky News. The company get a claim from Sky News due to use "Sky" name without their permission, in March 2006.

A sound bomb was thrown at the channel's headquarters in Belgradkapı, Zeytinburnu, Istanbul, on October 22, 2009, which was defused by the anti-bomb squad.

In June 2013 Skytürk was seized from Çukurova Holding by the government's Savings Deposit Insurance Fund over unpaid tax debts. In 2016 Skytürk was sold (together with newspaper Akşam and radio stations Best FM to Ethem Sancak.

Slogan 

 6/2002-23/1/2012: Anlamak İçin (To Understand)
 23/1/2012-11/2013: Olduğu Gibi Haber (News as it is)
 11/2013-12/2014: Her Açıdan (From every Angle)
 3/2015-5/2016: Hayatın Tamamı 360'ta (Whole of Life at 360)
 5/2016-9/2016: 360 Ekranı Hayatın Tamamı (360 Screen Whole of Life)
 9/2016-1/9/2017: Birlikte Çok Güzeliz (Much Beautiful Together)
 Since 1/9/2017: Yeni Nesil Yayıncılık (New Generation Broadcasting)

References

External links 
 

Television stations in Turkey
Turkish-language television stations
Television channels and stations established in 2002
Küçükçekmece